Hermann Biechele (March 1, 1918 – April 15, 1999) was a German politician of the Christian Democratic Union (CDU) and former member of the German Bundestag.

Life 
Biechele had been a member of the CDU and the Junge Union since 1946. From 1955 to 1977 he was chairman of the CDU district association of Constance-Land. Biechele was elected to the German Bundestag in the 1961 federal elections by direct mandate in Constance, where he was a member for five terms until 1980.

Literature

References

1918 births
1999 deaths
Members of the Bundestag for Baden-Württemberg
Members of the Bundestag 1976–1980
Members of the Bundestag 1972–1976
Members of the Bundestag 1969–1972
Members of the Bundestag 1965–1969
Members of the Bundestag 1961–1965
Members of the Bundestag for the Christian Democratic Union of Germany